Declaration is a sculpture by Mark di Suvero, installed in Venice, Los Angeles, in the U.S. state of California.

References 

Outdoor sculptures in Greater Los Angeles
Venice, Los Angeles
Works by Mark di Suvero